Ascensión is one of the 67 municipalities of Chihuahua, in northern Mexico. Ascensión City is the municipal seat.

As of 2010, the municipality had a total population of 23,975.

Geography

Towns and villages
The largest localities (cities, towns, and villages) are:

Adjacent municipalities and counties
 Juárez Municipality - east
 Ahumada Municipality - southeast
 Buenaventura Municipality - south
 Nuevo Casas Grandes Municipality - south
 Janos Municipality - west
 Hidalgo County, New Mexico - northwest
 Luna County, New Mexico - north
 Doña Ana County, New Mexico - northeast

References

 2010 census tables: INEGI

Municipalities of Chihuahua (state)